Downtown Santa Monica station is an at-grade light rail station in the Los Angeles County Metro Rail system. It is located near the intersection of 4th Street and Colorado Avenue in downtown Santa Monica, California. It is the E Line's western terminal station.

Overview 

The station is located in Downtown Santa Monica, off-street in the block bounded by 4th and 5th Streets, Colorado Avenue, and the 10 Freeway. The site is located in the midst of Santa Monica's Civic Center, within a short walk of the Pacific Ocean, Santa Monica Pier, the Third Street Promenade, the Civic Auditorium, and Santa Monica High School. The block was formerly the location of a Sears auto center, which was demolished in 2010 to make way for the station.

A trip from downtown Santa Monica to downtown Los Angeles takes 47 minutes.

During the 2028 Summer Olympics, the station will serve spectators traveling to and from venues located in Santa Monica and Venice.

Service

Station layout

Hours and frequency

Connections 
, the following connections are available:
 Big Blue Bus (Santa Monica): 1, 2, 3, Rapid 3, 5, 7, Express 7, Rapid 7, 8, 9, Rapid 10, 18

References

External links 

 Metro Expo Line Construction Authority
 Project Website, Metro Rail Expo Corridor, Phase 2 from Culver City to Santa Monica

E Line (Los Angeles Metro) stations
Santa Monica, California
Transportation in Santa Monica, California
Railway stations in the United States opened in 2016
2016 establishments in California